Bandarawela railway station is the 71st and eighth last railway station on the Main Line, and is  away from Colombo. All the trains that run on the Main Line, including the Podi Menike and Udarata Menike express trains stop at the station.

The construction of the railway line between Haputale and Bandarawela commenced in 1887 but it wasn't until 1893 that work on the line was completed. The first train arriving at the station on 19 June 1893. Bandarawela was the terminus of the Main Line until the line was extended to Badulla in 1924.

The station has a G2 locomotive on permanent display at the station. The diesel shunter locomotive was built by the North British Locomotive Company and operated between 1951 and 1986 at Maligawatta and Thali Mannar. It was moved to Bandarawela on 16 August 2011 and put on display.

Continuity

References

Railway stations in Badulla District
Railway stations on the Main Line (Sri Lanka)
Railway stations opened in 1893